William Thomas Hinton (born 1936) is a former Canadian Football League offensive guard who played nine years for the BC Lions from 1958 to 1966. In 1991, he was enshrined into the Canadian Football Hall of Fame.

College career
Hinton attended Louisiana Tech University and was a three-time All-GSC pick and as a senior, he helped lead his team to the Gulf States Conference Championship. He was inducted into the Louisiana Tech University Athletic Hall of Fame in 1987.

Canadian Football League career
Hinton played in all 16 regular season games in 7 of his 9 years with the Lions and finished his career as the best offensive lineman in the team's history. As a rookie in 1958, he made the Western all-star team. In his second year in the CFL, he was chosen the Outstanding Lineman and the Outstanding Player of the CFL. In 1963, Hinton makes both the All-Western and the All-Canadian All-Star teams, and helped lead his team to the Grey Cup. In addition, Hinton was a five time CFL All-Star selection.  He was elected into the Canadian Football Hall of Fame on May 11, 1991 and the BC Sports Hall of Fame in 1992.

Notes 

1936 births
Living people
American players of Canadian football
BC Lions players
Canadian Football Hall of Fame inductees
Canadian football offensive linemen
Louisiana Tech Bulldogs football players
Sportspeople from Ruston, Louisiana
Players of American football from Louisiana